The 2023 United States elections are scheduled to be held, in large part, on Tuesday, November 7, 2023. The off-year election includes gubernatorial and state legislative elections in a few states, as well as numerous citizen initiatives, mayoral races, and a variety of other local offices on the ballot. At least one special election to the United States Congress was scheduled as either deaths or vacancies arose.

Federal elections

House of Representatives

At least two special elections will be or have been held in 2023 to fill vacancies during the 118th U.S. Congress.
Virginia's 4th congressional district: Democrat Jennifer McClellan defeated Republican Leon Benjamin to succeed Donald McEachin, who died on November 28, 2022, of colorectal cancer. The district has a partisan index of D+16.
Rhode Island's 1st congressional district: Democrat David Cicilline will resign on June 1, 2023, to become the president and CEO of the Rhode Island Foundation. The district has a partisan index of D+14.

State elections

Gubernatorial elections

Three states will hold gubernatorial elections in 2023:

 Kentucky: One-term Democrat Andy Beshear is running for re-election.
 Louisiana: Two-term Democrat John Bel Edwards is term-limited in 2023 and therefore ineligible to seek re-election.
 Mississippi: One-term Republican Tate Reeves is running for re-election.

Attorney general elections

Three states will hold attorney general elections in 2023:

 Kentucky: One-term Republican Daniel Cameron is retiring to run for governor.
 Louisiana: Two-term Republican Jeff Landry is retiring to run for governor.
 Mississippi: One-term Republican Lynn Fitch is running for re-election.

Secretary of state elections
Three states will hold secretary of state elections in 2023:

 Kentucky: One-term Republican Michael Adams is running for re-election.
 Louisiana: Two-term incumbent Kyle Ardoin is eligible to seek re-election to a second full term.
 Mississippi: One-term incumbent Michael Watson is running for re-election.

State treasurer elections
Three states will hold state treasurer elections in 2023:

 Kentucky: Two-term Republican Allison Ball is term-limited and therefore ineligible to seek re-election. She is running for state auditor.
 Louisiana: Two-term Republican John Schroder is retiring to run for governor.
 Mississippi: One-term Republican David McRae is running for re-election.

State agriculture commissioner elections
Three states will hold agriculture commissioner elections in 2023:

 Kentucky: Two-term Republican Ryan Quarles is term-limited and therefore ineligible to seek re-election. He is running for governor.
 Louisiana: Four-term Republican Michael G. Strain is running for re-election.
 Mississippi: Two-term Republican Andy Gipson is running for re-election.

State supreme court elections
Two states, Wisconsin and Pennsylvania, will hold Supreme Court elections in 2023:
Wisconsin: Incumbent Justice Patience Roggensack is retiring. The election for a new justice will be held on April 4, 2023.
Pennsylvania: Justice Max Baer died in September 2022. The election for a new justice will be held on November 7, 2023.

Legislative

Legislative elections will be held for both houses of the Louisiana State Legislature, the Mississippi Legislature, the New Jersey Legislature, and the Virginia General Assembly. Kentucky, which holds gubernatorial elections in off-years, holds state legislative elections concurrent with presidential and midterm elections.

Referendum
One state held a statewide referendum: Oklahoma.

In a March special election, Oklahoma voters rejected State Question 820, a ballot initiative that would have legalized the recreational use of marijuana by people 21 and older.

Local elections

Mayoral elections
A number of U.S. cities will hold mayoral elections in 2023.

Eligible incumbents
 Arlington, Texas: Incumbent Republican Jim Ross is eligible for re-election.
 Cary, North Carolina: Incumbent independent Harold Weinbrecht is eligible for re-election.
 Charleston, South Carolina: Incumbent independent John Tecklenburg is running for re-election to a third term.

 Charlotte, North Carolina: Incumbent Democrat Vi Lyles is eligible for re-election.
 Chicago, Illinois: Incumbent Democrat Lori Lightfoot lost re-election to a second term.
 Columbus, Ohio: Incumbent Democrat Andrew Ginther is eligible for re-election.
 Dallas, Texas: Incumbent Democrat Eric Johnson is eligible for re-election.
Derby, Kansas: Incumbent independent Randy White is eligible to run for re-election.
 Fayetteville, North Carolina: Incumbent Democrat Mitch Colvin is eligible for re-election.
 Fort Worth, Texas: Incumbent Republican Mattie Parker is eligible for re-election.
 Indianapolis, Indiana: Incumbent Democrat Joe Hogsett is running for a third term.
 Kansas City, Missouri: Incumbent Democrat Quinton Lucas is running for re-election to a second term.
 Lincoln, Nebraska: Incumbent Democrat Leirion Gaylor Baird is running for re-election to a second term.
 Knoxville, Tennessee: Incumbent Democrat Indya Kincannon is running for re-election to a second term.
 San Antonio, Texas: Incumbent independent Ron Nirenberg is eligible for re-election.
 Salt Lake City, Utah: Incumbent Democrat Erin Mendenhall is eligible for re-election.
 Savannah, Georgia: Incumbent Democrat Van R. Johnson is running for re-election to a second term.
 Saint Petersburg Beach, Florida: Incumbent independent Alan Johnson is running for re-election to a third term.
 Tampa, Florida: Incumbent Democrat Jane Castor is running for re-election to a second term. As the only other candidate who qualified to appear on the ballot is a write-in candidate, it is likely that Castor will be re-elected.

 Tucson, Arizona: Incumbent Democrat Regina Romero is running for re-election.
 Wichita, Kansas: Incumbent Democrat Brandon Whipple is eligible for re-election.

Ineligible or retiring incumbents
 Colorado Springs, Colorado: Incumbent Republican John Suthers is ineligible to run for re-election due to term limits.
 Denver, Colorado: Incumbent Democrat Michael Hancock is ineligible to run for re-election due to term limits.
 Evansville, Indiana: Incumbent Republican Lloyd Winnecke is retiring.
 Hartford, Connecticut: Incumbent Democrat Luke Bronin is retiring.
 Houston, Texas: Incumbent Democrat Sylvester Turner is ineligible to run for re-election due to term limits.
 Jacksonville, Florida: Incumbent Republican Lenny Curry is ineligible to run for re-election due to term limits.
 Memphis, Tennessee: Incumbent Democrat Jim Strickland is ineligible to run for re-election due to term limits.
 Nashville, Tennessee: Incumbent Democrat John Cooper is retiring.
 Philadelphia, Pennsylvania: Incumbent Democrat Jim Kenney is ineligible to run for re-election due to term limits.
 Portland, Maine: Incumbent Democrat Kate Snyder is retiring.

Other local elections
Binghamton, New York: City Council
Boston, Massachusetts: City Council
Burlington, Vermont: City Council and clerks
Charlotte, North Carolina: City Council
Chicago, Illinois: City Council, City Clerk, City Treasurer, Police District Councils
Minneapolis, Minnesota: City Council
Multnomah County, Oregon: Board of Commissioners District 3 (special election)
Los Angeles, California: City Council
New York, New York: City Council
Philadelphia, Pennsylvania: City Council
Seattle, Washington: City Council
Saint Petersburg Beach, Florida: City Commission
West Linn, Oregon: City Council (rescheduled election after ballot error in November 2022)

Tribal elections
Several Native American tribes will hold elections for tribal executive positions during 2023, including the Choctaw Nation of Oklahoma and the Eastern Band of Cherokee Indians.

The Cherokee Nation will hold elections for principal chief, deputy chief, and eight of the seventeen Tribal Council seats on June 3.

Referendums
 The Eastern Band of Cherokee Indians will consider in September 2023 ballot referendums to change the structure of tribal government and establish term limits.

References

 
2023
November 2023 events in the United States